The second season of Madam Secretary an American political drama television series originally aired in the United States on CBS from October 4, 2015, through May 8, 2016. The season was produced by CBS Television Studios, with Barbara Hall as showrunner and executive producer. Debuting on September 21, 2014, the series was renewed for a second season on January 12, 2015. Madam Secretary was renewed for a third season on March 25, 2016.

The series follows Elizabeth McCord (Téa Leoni), a former CIA analyst and professor who becomes United States Secretary of State at the behest of President Conrad Dalton (Keith Carradine) after her predecessor is killed in a plane crash. Elizabeth works alongside a dedicated staff, including Nadine Tolliver (Bebe Neuwirth).

Cast and characters

Main
 Téa Leoni as Elizabeth McCord, the U.S. Secretary of State
 Tim Daly as Henry McCord, Elizabeth's husband and an N.S.A. operative
 Keith Carradine as Conrad Dalton, President of the United States
 Erich Bergen as Blake Moran, Elizabeth's personal assistant
 Patina Miller as Daisy Grant, Elizabeth's press coordinator
 Geoffrey Arend as Matt Mahoney, Elizabeth's speechwriter
 Kathrine Herzer as Alison McCord, Elizabeth and Henry's younger daughter
 Evan Roe as Jason McCord, Elizabeth and Henry's son
 Wallis Currie-Wood as Stephanie "Stevie" McCord, Elizabeth and Henry's older daughter
 Željko Ivanek as Russell Jackson, White House Chief of Staff
 Bebe Neuwirth as Nadine Tolliver, Elizabeth's Chief of Staff

Recurring
 Sebastian Arcelus as Jay Whitman, Elizabeth's policy advisor
 Jill Hennessy as Jane Fellows, Henry's former DIA handler and Ishbal Jahed task force member
 Carlos Gómez as Jose Campos, an Ishbal Jahed task force member
 Francis Jue as Chinese Foreign Minister Chen
 Angela Gots as Russian President Maria Ostrov
 Mandy Gonzalez as Lucy Knox, President Dalton's aide

Guests
 Morgan Freeman as Frawley, the Chief Justice of the United States
 Julian Acosta as Craig Sterling
 Madeleine Albright as herself, the first woman U.S. Secretary of State
 Kate Burton as Maureen McCord-Ryan, Henry's sister
 Jane Pauley as herself

Episodes

Production

Development
Madam Secretary was renewed for a second season on January 12, 2015. Madam Secretary was renewed for a third season on March 25, 2016.

Casting
Madeleine Albright guest role as herself a former Secretary of State, Jill Hennessy joined cast in a recurring role as Jane Fellows, Chris Petrovski was cast in a recurring role for the second season as Dmitri Petrov.

Broadcast
Season two of Madam Secretary premiered on October 4, 2015.

Ratings

Home media
The DVD release of season two is set to be released in Region 1 on September 13, 2016.

References

2015 American television seasons
2016 American television seasons
Season 2